Ras al Hadd Airport  is a new airport in Ash Sharqiyah Region of Oman, about 30 km south of the town of Ras al Hadd. Construction began in 2011, and was completed December, 2018.

See also
List of airports in Oman
Transport in Oman

References

External links
OpenStreetMap - Ras Al Hadd Airport
Oman tourism project
Ras Al Hadd regional airport

Airports in Oman